The 2014 Connacht Senior Football Championship was the 115th installment of the annual Connacht Senior Football Championship held under the auspices of Connacht GAA. It was one of the four provincial competitions of the 2014 All-Ireland Senior Football Championship. Mayo entered the competition as defending Connacht champions.

The draw to decide the fixtures was made on 3 October 2013. As in previous competitions, the opponents of London and New York in the opening round were decided in advance. The teams that visit the 'Exiles' are chosen on a cyclical basis. As in the 2009 Connacht Championship five years previously, Galway face London and Mayo face New York. Sligo were given a bye to the semi-final stage.

Under new GAA rules, to allow counties to more easily predict the dates of their qualifier matches, the two sides of the draw were named as either A or B. Galway, London and Sligo were named on the A side of the draw, while Leitrim, Mayo, New York and Roscommon's draw was named as the B side.

The opening game of the Championship was played on 4 May 2014, with Mayo beating New York by 4-18 to 0-08. On 18 May 2014 Roscommon defeated Leitrim in Dr. Hyde Park, winning 1-18 to 0-13, and the following week Galway beat London in the last of the quarter-finals, with a final score of 3-17 to 0-07. In the first of the semi-finals, which took place on 8 June 2014, Mayo faced Roscommon in Hyde Park, coming out with a narrow victory, winning 0-13 to 1-09. The second semi-final was contested by Galway and Sligo in Markievicz Park on 25 June 2014, with the Tribesmen coming out on top by 0-16 to 0-11, qualifying for their first Connacht final since 2009.

The decider was played on 13 July 2014, with Galway facing Mayo in MacHale Park. Mayo were comfortably the better team in the first half, and led by 1-09 to 0-05 at the interval. Despite pressure from Galway early in the second half, with Shane Walsh hitting the crossbar and later having a penalty saved, Mayo maintained their lead through second half goals from Barry Moran and Jason Doherty. Mayo ultimately won by a score of 3-14 to 0-16. Mayo lifted the J.J. Nestor Cup for the fourth season in a row, the first time the county achieved a Connacht four-in-a-row since the 1951 season.

Teams
The Connacht championship is contested by the five counties in the Irish province of Connacht and the two foreign based teams of London and New York.

Bracket

Fixtures

Quarter-finals

Semi-finals

Final

See also
Fixtures and results
 2014 All-Ireland Senior Football Championship
 2014 Leinster Senior Football Championship
 2014 Munster Senior Football Championship
 2014 Ulster Senior Football Championship

References

2C
Connacht Senior Football Championship